Marián Chobot (born 31 August 1999) is a Slovak football player. He currently plays for Slovan Bratislava and had previously featured for Slovakia U21.

Club career
He made his Fortuna Liga debut for Nitra on 28 July 2018 in a game against Žilina. Chobot played from start, but was replaced by Christián Steinhübel after 54 minutes. Žilina won the game 2-1.

References

External links
 

1999 births
Living people
Sportspeople from Topoľčany
Slovak footballers
Slovakia youth international footballers
Slovakia under-21 international footballers
Association football forwards
FC Nitra players
ŠK Slovan Bratislava players
FC ViOn Zlaté Moravce players
Slovak Super Liga players